Nathaniel James Potvin is an American actor and dancer. He is known for his role as Ryan Walker in the sci-fi adventure comedy television series Mech-X4, Ryan in the sitcom Alexa & Katie and as Wallace Marks in the teen drama Five Points.

Filmography

Film

Television

References

External links
 

1999 births
Living people
American male film actors
American male television actors
American male child actors
Male actors from Los Angeles
People from Van Nuys, Los Angeles
African-American male child actors
Granada Hills Charter High School alumni
21st-century African-American people